Hirut Woldemariam (born 24 October 1975) is an Ethiopian writer, teacher, politician and former minister of the Ministry of Science and Higher Education (Ethiopia), Ministry of Culture and Tourism, Ministry of Labor and Social Affairs. She was the first female Vice president of Addis Ababa University.

Life and career 
Hirut Woldemariam was born in Debre Markos, Gojjam, Ethiopia from her father Woldemariam Teketel, from Kambata, and her mother Brehane Mekonen, from Debre Marqos. She has received both her Bachelor of Arts and Master of Arts in Linguistics from Addis Ababa University and her Doctor of Philosophy in Linguistics from the University of Cologne, Institute of African Studies. She is a professor in the Department of Linguistics and Philology, College of Humanities, Journalism and Communication of the Addis Ababa University.

Hirut served in different position of vice presidency in Addis Ababa University namely: Vice president for Institutional Development (April 2012 – October 2014), Vice president of External Relations, Strategic Planning and Partnership (January 2010 – April 2012), and Associate Vice President for Academic Affairs (2008–2010) for about seven years. She also served as a Head, Department of Linguistics, Faculty of Humanities, Addis Ababa University (2006–2008).

Hirut has been of service to Ethiopia in many cabinet minister's position, which are Ministry of Culture and Tourism (2008–2016),  Ministry of Labor and Social Affairs (April–October 2018) and Ministry of Science and Higher Education (October 2018 – August 2020). Hirut is now performing duties on a position of Social Affairs Advisor to the Prime Minister.

Hirut has more than 29 original publication and 5 unpublished manuscripts, which are more focused on Omotic languages, descriptive linguistics, historical-comparative linguistics and sociolinguistics in Addis Ababa University.

References 

1975 births
Living people
21st-century Ethiopian politicians
Ministers of Science and Higher Education
Ministers of Culture and Tourism (Ethiopia)
Ministers of Labor and Social Affairs of Ethiopia
People from Debre Markos
Linguists from Ethiopia